Alicia Boole Stott (8 June 1860 – 17 December 1940) was a British mathematician. Despite never holding an academic position, she made a number of valuable contributions to the field, receiving an honorary doctorate from the University of Groningen. She is best known for introducing the term "polytope" for a convex solid in four (or more) dimensions, and having an impressive grasp of four-dimensional geometry from a very early age.

Early life
Alicia Boole was born in Cork, Ireland, the third daughter and one of five siblings of English parents; mathematician and logician George Boole and Mary Everest Boole, a self-taught mathematician and educationalist. Other of her sisters were notable in their own right. Lucy Everest Boole was a chemist and pharmacist and Ethel Lilian Voynich was a novelist. After her father's sudden death in 1864, the family moved to London, where her mother became the librarian at Queen's College, London. She attended the school attached to Queens' College with one of her sisters, but never attended university. She was known to her friends and family as Alice, though she always published under the name Alicia.

Early career
Alicia was the only Boole sister to inherit the mathematical career of her parents, although her mother Mary Everest Boole had brought up all of her five children from an early age 'to acquaint them with the flow of geometry' by projecting shapes onto paper, hanging pendulums etc. She was first exposed to geometric models by her brother-in-law Charles Howard Hinton when she was 17, and developed the ability to visualise in a fourth dimension. She found that there were exactly six regular polytopes in four dimensions and that they are bounded by 5, 16 or 600 tetrahedra, 8 cubes, 24 octahedra or 120 dodecahedra. That discovery had been made by Ludwig Schläfli before 1850 but his work was as yet unpublished, and in any case Alicia had no opportunity to study mathematics. She introduced the term polytope because she did not know Schläfli's term polyscheme. She produced three-dimensional central cross-sections of all the six regular polytopes by purely Euclidean constructions and synthetic methods for the simple reason that she had never learned any analytic geometry. She made cardboard models of all these sections.

Later career
After taking up secretarial work near Liverpool in 1889 she met and married Walter Stott, an actuary, in 1890. They had two children together, Mary (1891–1982) and Leonard (1892–1963). Stott learned of Pieter Schoute's work on central sections of the regular polytopes in 1895. Schoute came to England and worked with Alicia Stott, persuading her to publish her results which she did in two papers published in Amsterdam in 1900 and 1910.

The University of Groningen honoured her by inviting her to attend the tercentenary celebrations of the university and awarding her an honorary doctorate in 1914. After Schoute's death in 1913 Alicia took a hiatus from mathematical work.

In 1930 she was introduced by her nephew Geoffrey Ingram Taylor to Harold Scott MacDonald Coxeter and they worked together on various problems. Alicia made two further important discoveries relating to constructions for polyhedra related to the golden section. She presented a joint paper with Coxeter at the University of Cambridge. Coxeter later wrote, "The strength and simplicity of her character combined with the diversity of her interests to make her an inspiring friend."

Legacy
Alicia died in Middlesex in 1940. In spring 2001, a paper roll of coloured drawings of polyhedra was found at Groningen University. Though unsigned, it was immediately recognised as Alicia's work. It led to research by Irene Polo-Blanco, who dedicated a chapter to Alicia's work in her book Theory and History of Mathematical Models (2007). The pioneering spirit of grandfather and mother continued in her son Leonard, who assisted in tuberculosis treatment and invented an artificial pneumothorax apparatus.

Publications (external links)
A. Boole Stott: Geometrical deduction of semiregular from regular polytopes and space fillings, Verhandelingen van de Koninklijke Akademie van Wetenschappen, Verhandelingen Natuurkunde, Eerste Sectie, deel 11, nummer 1 (1910), 1–24. Amsterdam, 1910.
All publications by A. Boole Stott (as an author and as a co-author) with the Koninklijke Akademie van Wetenschappen

Citations

References

Other external links

1860 births
1940 deaths
19th-century English mathematicians
20th-century English mathematicians
British women mathematicians
People from Cork (city)
People from London
Geometers
University of Groningen alumni
20th-century women mathematicians